Golf Channel France is a television channel broadcasting from Luxembourg devoted to golf since September 2010. It belongs to Mediawan Thematics.

History
Golf Channel France is a partnership between Mediawan Thematics and the American television channel Golf Channel. Thus, the French channel broadcasts programs from the US channel. It was the only thematic channel devoted solely to golf in France before the launch of Golf+ by the Canal+ Group in July 2012. Golf+ holds all rights to broadcast European and American tournaments for direct broadcasts. Golf Channel does not broadcast any of these live tournaments, but instead airs the LPGA Tour, Solheim Cup and Asian Tour.

References

External links
 

Mediawan Thematics
Golf Channel
Television stations in France
Sports television networks in France
Television channels and stations established in 2010
French-language television stations
2010 establishments in Luxembourg